The Giannonatti Ranch, in Harding County, South Dakota near Ludlow, includes 10 structures dating from around 1900.  A  portion of the ranch was listed on the National Register of Historic Places in 1987.

Six of the structures are contributing buildings, one is a contributing structure, the rest were deemed not to contribute to the historic character of the property.

References

Ranches on the National Register of Historic Places in South Dakota
National Register of Historic Places in Harding County, South Dakota
Buildings and structures completed in 1900